The Moravița is a left tributary of the river Bârzava in Romania. It discharges into the Bârzava in Bocșa.

References

Rivers of Romania
Rivers of Caraș-Severin County